Profoundly Blue is an album led by guitarist Tiny Grimes recorded in 1973 and released on the Muse label.

Reception

In his review for AllMusic, Scott Yanow stated "The veteran swing guitarist Tiny Grimes had relatively few chances to record during the '60s and '70s, particularly for American labels. This enjoyable outing for Muse features Grimes in a sextet with tenor saxophonist Houston Person and pianist Harold Mabern".

Track listing
All compositions by Tiny Grimes and Connie Hayes except as indicated
 "Blue Midnight" - 6:48
 "Backslider" - 4:27
 "Tiny's Exercise" - 7:24
 "Profoundly Blue" (Meade Lux Lewis) - 5:19
 "Matilda" (Traditional) - 4:01
 "Cookin' at the Cookery" - 10:03

Personnel
Tiny Grimes - guitar, vocals
Houston Person - tenor saxophone
Harold Mabern - piano
Jimmy Lewis - electric bass 
Freddie Waits - drums
Gene Golden - congas

References 

1973 albums
Tiny Grimes albums
Muse Records albums
Albums produced by Don Schlitten